Arthur R. Baker (born December 31, 1937) is a former collegiate and professional American football player.  He played college football at Syracuse University, where he was an All-American fullback in the backfield with Heisman Trophy winner Ernie Davis.  He was also an NCAA wrestling champion at Syracuse in 1959, becoming only the second African-American to win an NCAA wrestling title. The only college athlete to win division one titles in two different sports in the same year 1959.  He played professionally in the American Football League (AFL) for the Buffalo Bills in 1961 and 1962. He then went to the Canadian Football League (CFL), where he played four seasons, mainly for the Hamilton Tiger-Cats. Baker lives in Miami Florida.

See also
 List of American Football League players

References

1937 births
Living people
American football fullbacks
Buffalo Bills players
Calgary Stampeders players
Hamilton Tiger-Cats players
Syracuse Orange football players
Syracuse Orangemen wrestlers
Sportspeople from Erie, Pennsylvania
Players of American football from Pennsylvania
African-American players of American football
African-American players of Canadian football
American Football League players
21st-century African-American people
20th-century African-American sportspeople